Kia Nurse (born February 22, 1996) is a Canadian basketball player for the Seattle Storm of the Women's National Basketball Association (WNBA). She is also a basketball analyst featured on TSN.

Nurse has played for the Canada Women's National Basketball team. She was selected to play in the 2020 Summer Olympics.

Early years
Kia Nurse began playing basketball at the age of four, and by the time she was seven years old, she was playing in a competitive league. Nurse attended St.Vincent de Paul Elementary School.

Nurse played basketball while attending St. Thomas More Catholic Secondary School in Hamilton, Ontario. During her playing career, she helped the team win three consecutive OFSAA high school championships in 2011, 2012 and 2013. She played for the Hamilton Transway Club team, winning seven consecutive provincial championships.

College
Nurse played college basketball at the University of Connecticut in Storrs, Connecticut for the Huskies. In her time at UConn, Nurse played under head coach Geno Auriemma, alongside players such as Breanna Stewart, Gabby Williams and Napheesa Collier.

Approximately 50 colleges and universities contacted Nurse to ask her to consider playing for their team. She initially narrowed down the list to four teams, Connecticut, Penn State, Indiana, and Kentucky, but eventually chose Connecticut. After signing her letter of intent, she revealed that she had recorded a goal of playing for Connecticut when she was in Grade 7.

Statistics 

|-
|2014–15
| align="left" |Connecticut
|39
|36
|–
|.485
|.407
|.721
|3.1
|2.7
|1.4
|0.1
|1.5
|10.2
|-
| 2015–16
| align="left" | Connecticut
|38
|38
|28.3
|.442
|.369
|.753
|1.9
|2.7
|1.3
|0.1
|1.3
|9.3
|-
|2016–17
| align="left"|Connecticut
|33
|33
|30.6
|.480
|.462
|.855
|2.0
|3.8
|1.0
|0.1
|1.5
|12.7
|-
|2017–18
| align="left"|Connecticut
|33
|33
|33.1
|.519
|.442
|.809
|3.5
|2.7
|1.2
|0.3
|1.2
|13.5
|-
|Career
|
|147
|144
|30.6 
|.483
|.423
|.784
|2.6
|3.0
|1.2
|0.1 
|1.4 
|11.4

Career

WNBA
At the 2018 WNBA draft, Nurse was drafted by the New York Liberty in the first round as the tenth overall pick. Nurse would join the Liberty alongside players such as Tina Charles and Epiphanny Prince. Nurse made her WNBA debut on May 20, 2018, scoring 17 points in an eventual 80–76 loss to the Chicago Sky. In June 2018, Nurse scored 34 points, a season-high amongst WNBA rookies, in the Liberty's 87–81 overtime victory over the Indiana Fever.

In July 2019, Nurse was named as a starter for the WNBA All-Star Game for the first time in her career. Her selection made her just the third Canadian to play in the All-Star Game. Nurse was selected by and joined Team Delle Donne for the game. Nurse also participated in the Three-Point Contest but lost in the first round.

National Team

Youth Level
Kia Nurse was invited to play on the under-17 national team in the FIBA Under-17 World Championship for Women, held in Amsterdam in 2012. She averaged almost 14 points per game and helped the team finish third place.

Senior Level
Nurse was invited to join the national team, to play in the 2013 FIBA Americas Championship for Women, held in Xalapa, Mexico from September 21–28, 2013. She averaged ten points per game and helped the Canadian National team to a second place, silver medal finish. Canada faced Cuba in a preliminary round and won 53–40, but in the championship game, Cuba prevailed 79–71.  

Nurse played on the Canadian national team in the 2014 FIBA World Championship. The team lost to Australia in the quarterfinals, then beat France and China to finish in fifth place. Nurse averaged almost 22 minutes per game at the point guard position, averaging almost seven points per game, fourth most on the roster while being the youngest player on the roster.

Nurse was a member of the Canada women's national basketball team, which participated in basketball at the 2015 Pan American Games held in Toronto, Ontario July 10 to 26, 2015. Canada opened the preliminary rounds with an easy 101–38 win over Venezuela. The following day they beat Argentina 73–58. The final preliminary game was against Cuba; both teams were 2–0, so the winner would win the group. The game went down to the wire, with Canada eking out a 71–68 win. Canada defeated Brazil in the semifinal, 91–63. In front of a home crowd, the Canadians were able to take down the United States 81–73 and take home the gold medal. It was Canada's first gold medal in basketball in the Pan Am games. Nurse was the star for Canada with 33 points, hitting 11 of her 12 free-throw attempts and 10 of her 17 field-goal attempts, including two of three three-pointers. Her performance led to her selection as the flag-bearer in the event's closing ceremonies.

Nurse played for Canada at the 2015 FIBA Americas Women's Championship, a qualifying event held in Edmonton, Alberta, Canada, in August 2015. Canada won the first three games, easily winning first place in the group for a spot in the semifinal against the second-place team in group B, Brazil. The semifinal game against Brazil was much closer. Canada led by only six points at halftime but gradually expanded the lead to end up with an 83–66 win and a spot in the gold-medal game. The gold-medal game was a rematch with Cuba where Canada took home the win, 82–66. As the game wound down to the close, the crowd was chanting "Rio", "Rio", "Rio" in recognition of the fact that the win qualifies Canada for the Olympics in Rio in 2016. Nurse was the leading scorer for Canada with 20 points, and her overall performance earned her the MVP award for the entire event.

In 2016, Nurse made her Olympic debut for Team Canada at the Summer Olympics in Rio de Janeiro. Canada finished in seventh place.

Career statistics

WNBA

Regular season

|-
| align="left" | 2018
| align="left" | New York
| 34 || 7 || 22.8 || .402 || .294 || .870 || 2.4 || 1.6 || 0.7 || 0.1 || 0.9 || 9.1
|-
| align="left" | 2019
| align="left" | New York
| 34 || 34 || 29.4 || .393 || .353 || .872 || 2.5 || 2.3 || 0.7 || 0.1 || 1.6 || 13.7
|-
| align="left" | 2020
| align="left" | New York
| 21 || 18 || 27.5 || .273 || .238 || .864 || 2.9 || 2.3 || 0.5 || 0.2 || 2.2 || 12.2
|-
| align="left" | 2021
| align="left" | Phoenix
| 32 || 32 || 26.1 || .359 || .353 || .790 || 3.5 || 1.8 || 0.5 || 0.1 || 1.5 || 9.5
|-
| align="left" | Career
| align="left" | 4 years, 2 teams
| 121 || 91 || 26.3 || .361 || .316 || .856 || 2.8 || 2.0 || 0.6 || 0.1 || 1.5 || 11.0
|}

Postseason

|-
| style='text-align:left;'|2021
| style='text-align:left;'|Phoenix
| 6 || 6 || 21.8 || .432 || .455 || 1.000 || 3.3 || 1.5 || 0.2 || 0.0 || 0.7 || 8.3
|-
| align="left" | Career
| align="left" | 1 year, 1 team
| 6 || 6 || 21.8 || .432 || .455 || 1.000 || 3.3 || 1.5 || 0.2 || 0.0 || 0.7 || 8.3
|}

Personal life
Kia Nurse was born to Richard and Cathy Nurse and was raised in Hamilton, Ontario. Richard Nurse played in the CFL, and Cathy Nurse was a basketball player at McMaster University. Her older siblings are Tamika Nurse, who played basketball for Oregon and Bowling Green, and professional hockey player Darnell Nurse. She is also the niece of former Philadelphia Eagles quarterback Donovan McNabb, who is married to her aunt Raquel Nurse McNabb. Her cousin is Sarah Nurse, who played for the Wisconsin Badgers women's ice hockey program and competed at the 2018 Winter Olympics and 2022 Winter Olympics for Team Canada.

References

External links

1996 births
Living people
Basketball people from Ontario
Basketball players at the 2015 Pan American Games
Basketball players at the 2016 Summer Olympics
Basketball players at the 2020 Summer Olympics
Black Canadian basketball players
Canadian expatriate basketball people in Australia
Canadian expatriate basketball people in the United States
Canadian sportspeople of Trinidad and Tobago descent
Canadian women's basketball players
Medalists at the 2015 Pan American Games
New York Liberty draft picks
New York Liberty players
Nurse family
Olympic basketball players of Canada
Pan American Games gold medalists for Canada
Pan American Games medalists in basketball
Phoenix Mercury players
Point guards
Sportspeople from Hamilton, Ontario
UConn Huskies women's basketball players
Women's National Basketball Association All-Stars